Land degradation is a process in which the value of the biophysical environment is affected by a combination of human-induced processes acting upon the land. 
It is viewed as any change or disturbance to the land perceived to be deleterious or undesirable. Natural hazards are excluded as a cause; however human activities can indirectly affect phenomena such as floods and bush fires.

Expert projections suggest that land degradation will be an important theme of the 21st century, impacting agricultural productivity, biodiversity loss, environmental change, and its effects on food security. It is estimated that up to 4% of the world's agricultural land is seriously degraded.

According to the Special Report on Climate Change and Land of the Intergovernmental Panel on Climate Change: "About a quarter of the Earth's ice-free land area is subject to human-induced degradation (medium confidence). Soil erosion from agricultural fields is estimated to be currently 11 to 20 times (no-tillage) to more than 100 times (conventional tillage) higher than the soil formation rate (medium confidence).".

The United Nations estimate that about 30% of land is degraded worldwide, and about 3.2 billion people reside in these degrading areas. About 12 million hectares of productive land – which roughly equals the size of Greece – is degraded every year. This happens because people exploit the land without protecting it. The United Nations Sustainable Development Goal 15 has a target to restore degraded land and soil and achieve a land degradation-neutral world by 2030.

Consequences
There are four main ways of looking at land degradation and its impact on the environment around it:

A temporary or permanent decline in the productive capacity of the land. This can be seen through a loss of biomass, a loss of actual productivity or in potential productivity, or a loss or change in vegetative cover and soil nutrients.
Action in the land's capacity to provide resources for human livelihoods. This can be measured from a base line of past land use.
Loss of biodiversity: A loss of range of species or ecosystem complexity as a decline in the environmental quality.
Shifting ecological risk: increased vulnerability of the environment or people to destruction or crisis. This is measured through a base line in the form of pre-existing risk of crisis or destruction.

A problem with defining land degradation is that what one group of people might view as degradation, others might view as a benefit or opportunity. For example, planting crops at a location with heavy rainfall and steep slopes would create scientific and environmental concern regarding the risk of soil erosion by water, yet farmers could view the location as a favourable one for high crop yields.

Different types 

In addition to the usual types of land degradation that have been known for centuries (water, wind and mechanical erosion, physical, chemical and biological degradation), four other types have emerged in the last 50 years:
 pollution, often chemical, due to agricultural, industrial, mining or commercial activities;
 loss of arable land due to urban construction, road building, land conversion, agricultural expansion, etc.;
 artificial radioactivity, sometimes accidental;
 land-use constraints associated with armed conflicts.

Overall, more than 36 types of land degradation can be assessed. All are induced or aggravated by human activities, e.g. soil erosion, soil contamination, soil acidification, sheet erosion, silting, aridification, salinization, urbanization, etc.

Causes

Land degradation is a global problem largely related to agricultural use, deforestation and climate change. Causes include:

 Land clearance, such as clearcutting and deforestation
 Agricultural depletion of soil nutrients through poor farming practices
 Livestock including overgrazing and overdrafting
 Inappropriate irrigation and overdrafting
 Urban sprawl and commercial development
 Vehicle off-roading
Quarrying of stone, sand, ore and minerals
 Increase in field size due to economies of scale, reducing shelter for wildlife, as hedgerows and copses disappear
 Exposure of naked soil after harvesting by heavy equipment
 Monoculture, destabilizing the local ecosystem
 Dumping of non-biodegradable trash, such as plastics
 Invasive Species
 Climate change
 Loss of soil carbon

Overcutting of vegetation occurs when people cut forests, woodlands and shrublands—to obtain timber, fuelwood and other products—at a pace exceeding the rate of natural regrowth. This is frequent in semi-arid environments, where fuelwood shortages are often severe. 
 
Overgrazing is the grazing of natural pastures at stocking intensities above the livestock carrying capacity; the resulting decrease in the vegetation cover is a leading cause of wind and water erosion. It is a significant factor in Afghanistan. The growing population pressure, during 1980–1990, has led to decreases in the already small areas of agricultural land per person in six out of eight countries (14% for India and 21% for Pakistan).

Population pressure also operates through other mechanisms. Improper agricultural practices, for instance, occur only under constraints such as the saturation of good lands under population pressure which leads settlers to cultivate too shallow or too steep soils, plough fallow land before it has recovered its fertility, or attempt to obtain multiple crops by irrigating unsuitable soils.

High population density is not always related to land degradation. Rather, it is the practices of the human population that can cause a landscape to become degraded. Populations can be a benefit to the land and make it more productive than it is in its natural state. Land degradation is an important factor of internal displacement in many African and Asian countries.

Severe land degradation affects a significant portion of the Earth's arable lands, decreasing the wealth and economic development of nations. As the land resource base becomes less productive, food security is compromised and competition for dwindling resources increases, the seeds of famine and potential conflict are sown.

Climate change and land degradation
According to the Special Report on Climate Change and Land of the Intergovernmental Panel on Climate Change climate change is one of the causes of land degradation. The report state that: "Climate change exacerbates land degradation, particularly in lowlying coastal areas, river deltas, drylands and in permafrost areas (high confidence). Over the period 1961–2013, the annual area of drylands in drought has increased, on average by slightly more than 1% per year, with large inter-annual variability. In 2015, about 500 (380–620) million people lived within areas which experienced desertification between the year 1980s and 2000s. The highest numbers of people affected are in South and East Asia, the circum Sahara region including North Africa, and the Middle East including the Arabian Peninsula (low confidence). Other dryland regions have also experienced desertification. People living in already degraded or desertified areas are increasingly negatively affected by climate change (high confidence)." Additionally, it is claimed that 74% of the poor are directly affected by land degradation globally.

Significant land degradation from seawater inundation, particularly in river deltas and on low-lying islands, is a potential hazard that was identified in a 2007 IPCC report. As a result of sea-level rise from climate change, salinity levels can reach levels where agriculture becomes impossible in very low-lying areas.

One way to consider climate change and land degradation is through the discipline of Land Change Science, which, among other things, tracks the long-term consequences of land degradation on the climate of a given area. By understanding the links between land degradation and climate change, scientists can better inform the creation of policies to reduce harm.

In 2009 the European Investment Bank agreed to invest up to $45 million in the Land Degradation Neutrality Fund (LDN Fund). Launched at UNCCD COP 13 in 2017, the LDN Fund invests in projects that generate environmental benefits, socio-economic benefits, and financial returns for investors. The Fund was initially capitalized at US$100 million and is expected to grow to US$300 million.

In the 2022 IPCC report, land degradation is responding more directly to climate change as all types of erosion and SOM declines (soil focus) are increasing. Other land degradation pressures are also being caused by human pressures like managed ecosystems. These systems include human run croplands and pastures.

Landslides also come into effect which is the cause of intensive events such as individual rain storms.

Sensitivity and resilience
Sensitivity and resilience are measures of the vulnerability of a landscape to degradation. These two factors combine to explain the degree of vulnerability. Sensitivity is the degree to which a land system undergoes change due to natural forces, human intervention or a combination of both. Resilience is the ability of a landscape to absorb change, without significantly altering the relationship between the relative importance and numbers of individuals and species that compose the community. It also refers to the ability of the region to return to its original state after being changed in some way. The resilience of a landscape can be increased or decreased through human interaction based upon different methods of land-use management. Land that is degraded becomes less resilient than undegraded land, which can lead to even further degradation through shocks to the landscape.

See also

Environmental impact of irrigation
Land improvement
Land reclamation
Sustainable agriculture
Economics of Land Degradation Initiative
Desertification
Population growth
Soil#Degradation
Tillage erosion

References

Further reading 
  This article incorporates text in the public domain produced by the USDA Natural Resources Conservation Service
 
 D.L. Johnson and L.A. Lewis  Land Degradation: Creation and Destruction, 2nd edition, Rowman and Littlefield, Lanham, Boulder, New York, Toronto, Oxford, 2007.

External links 
 The Economics of Land Degradation Initiative – Homepage

Environmental issues with soil
Physical geography
Human impact on the environment